Yucca gloriosa is a species of flowering plant in the family Asparagaceae, native to the southeastern United States. It is widely cultivated as an ornamental for its architectural qualities, and has reportedly become established in warmer climates in the wild in various parts of the world.

Names
Common names include:-

Adam's needle
glorious yucca
lord's candlestick
mound lily
moundlily yucca
palm lily
Roman candle
Sea Islands yucca
soft-tipped yucca
Spanish bayonet
Spanish-dagger
tree lily

Description
Yucca gloriosa is caulescent, usually with several stems arising from the base, the base thickening in adult specimens. They are dark green with entire margins, smooth, rarely finely denticulate, acuminate, with a sharp brown terminal spine.

Habitat
Yucca gloriosa grows on exposed sand dunes along the coast and barrier islands of the subtropical southeastern USA, often together with Yucca aloifolia and a variety formerly called Yucca recurvifolia or Y. gloriosa var. recurvifolia, now Y. gloriosa var. tristis. In contrast to Y. gloriosa var. tristis, the leaves of Y. gloriosa var. gloriosa are hard stiff, erect and narrower. On the other hand, Y. aloifolia has leaves with denticulate margins and a sharp-pointed, terminal spine.

Distribution
Yucca gloriosa is native to the coast and barrier islands of southeastern North America, growing on sand dunes. It ranges from extreme southeastern Virginia south to northern Florida in the United States. It is associated with Yucca filamentosa, Yucca aloifolia, and Opuntia species.

Cultivation
The plant is widely cultivated in warm temperate and subtropical climates, and valued as an architectural focal point. It has reportedly escaped from cultivation and naturalised in Italy, Turkey, Mauritius, Réunion, Guam, the Northern Mariana Islands, Puerto Rico, Argentina, Chile and Uruguay.
In landscape use, little maintenance is needed other than the removal of dead leaves when the shrub nears its ultimate height.

Yucca gloriosa, and the cultivars 'Variegata' and  = ‘Walbristar’ have gained the Royal Horticultural Society's Award of Garden Merit.

Properties
Yucca gloriosa has been known to cause skin irritation and even allergic reactions upon contact. The leaf points are even sharp enough to break the skin.

Forms and varieties
In collections in Europe and overseas, there are many forms and hybrids (Sprenger, Förster) from the 18th and 19th centuries. The following names have been used for material of uncertain origin in the European garden flora.

Yucca gloriosa var. minor Carr.
Yucca gloriosa var. obliqua Baker
Yucca gloriosa f. obliqua (Harworth)Voss
Yucca gloriosa f. acuminata (Sweet)Voss
Yucca gloriosa f. pruinosa (Baker)Voss
Yucca gloriosa f. tortulata (Baker)Voss
Yucca gloriosa' var. medio-striata PlanchonYucca gloriosa var. robusta Carr.Yucca gloriosa var. nobilis Carr.Yucca gloriosa f. planifolia Engelmann|Yucca gloriosa var. plicata EngelmannYucca gloriosa var. genuina EngelmannYucca gloriosa var. flexilis TreleaseYucca gloriosa  var. plicata Carr.Yucca gloriosa var. superba BakerYucca gloriosa var. longifolia Carr.Yucca gloriosa var. muculata Carr.Yucca pendula Sieber ex Carr.Yucca pattens AndreYucca pruinosa'' Baker

References

External links

 http://yuccaagavaceae.com/photos/details.php?image_id=82 Original Erstbeschreibung

gloriosa
Endemic flora of the United States
Flora of the Southeastern United States
Plants described in 1753
Taxa named by Carl Linnaeus
Least concern flora of the United States
Garden plants of North America
Shrubs